Alexander Dew Chaplin (10 April 1872 – 18 January 1938) was a Canadian businessman and politician. Chaplin was a Conservative member of the House of Commons of Canada. He was born in Port Granby, Ontario and became a manufacturer.

The son of William Lamont Chaplin and Harriet Dew, he was educated in St. Catharines, Ontario and Toronto, Ontario.

Chaplin was managing director and secretary-treasurer for the Chatham, Ontario based Hayes Wheel Company of Canada  and was first elected to Parliament at the Kent, Ontario riding in the 1925 general election. After serving one term in Parliament, Chaplin was defeated in the 1926 federal election by James Rutherford of the Liberal party.

His brother James Dew and his nephew Gordon Chaplin also served in the House of Commons.

References

External links
 

1872 births
1938 deaths
Businesspeople from Ontario
Members of the House of Commons of Canada from Ontario
Conservative Party of Canada (1867–1942) MPs
People from Clarington